On Tour is a live album by Yann Tiersen. It was originally released in 2006 and features songs from Tiersen's past albums as well as some previously unreleased compositions. The album is notable for having a different approach to Tiersen's musical style: the usual multi-instrumental ensemble was replaced with electric guitars and an ondes Martenot, giving the music a fresh rendition.

On Tour was also released as a DVD.

Track listing
All music and lyrics are written by Yann Tiersen, except as noted.

CD release
 "La Terrasse" – 5:08
 "La Rade" (feat. Katel) – 3:24
 "Ma France à moi" (Diam's, Grégory Berthou, Tyran) (feat. Diam's and Grégoire Simon) – 3:49
 "Les Bras de mer" (Dominique A) – 5:31
 "1er réveil par temps de guerre" (Marc Sens, Tiersen) – 4:17
 "Mary" (feat. Elizabeth Fraser) – 3:21
 "La Perceuse" (Christine Ott, Jean-Paul Roy, Ludovic Morillon, Sens, Tiersen) – 2:15
 "State of Shock" (The Ex, Tom Cora) (feat. Marc Sens) – 5:36
 "Le Train" – 4:46
 "Esther" – 7:15
 "La Rade" (Studio version) – 3:05

DVD release
 "La Valse d'Amélie"
 "A Secret Place"
 "La Crise"
 "Monochrome"
 "Bagatelle" (Dominique A, Tiersen)
 "Le Quartier"
 "Les Bras de mer" (Dominique A)
 "1er réveil par temps de Guerre" (Marc Sens, Tiersen) / "Sur le fil"
 "La Terrasse"
 "La Rade" (feat. Katel)
 "La Perceuse" (Christine Ott, Jean-Paul Roy, Ludovic Morillon, Sens, Tiersen)
 "Kala" (feat. Elizabeth Fraser)
 "La Boulange"
 "Western"
 "Le Banquet"
 "State of Shock" (The Ex, Tom Cora) (feat. Marc Sens)
 "À ceux qui sont malades par mer calme" (feat. DD La Fleur)
 "Le Train"
 "Esther"

 DVD bonus tracks
 "La Veillée"
 "Ma France à moi" (Diam's, Grégory Berthou, Tyran) (feat. Diam's and Grégoire Simon)
 "Les Enfants"

Personnel

Musicians
 Yann Tiersen – vocals, guitar, violin, toy piano
 Marc Sens – vocals, guitar, melodica, drill
 Grégoire Simon – vocals, horns
 Diam's – vocals
 Katel – vocals, guitar
 Elizabeth Fraser – vocals
 DD La Fleur – vocals
 Christine Ott – ondes Martenot
 Stéphane Bouvier – bass
 Ludovic Morillon – drums

Production
 Fabrice Laureau – producer, engineer, mixing
 Yann Tiersen – mixing
 Aymeric Letoquart – mixing
 John Dent – mastering

Charts

References

Yann Tiersen albums
2006 live albums
Live video albums
2006 video albums